Everts Air Cargo is an American Part 121 airline based in Fairbanks, Alaska, USA. It operates D.O.D, scheduled and charter airline cargo within Alaska, Canada, Mexico and the continental United States. Its maintenance base is Fairbanks International Airport with its major cargo hub at Ted Stevens Anchorage International Airport.  The company slogan is Legendary Aircraft. Extraordinary Service.

History 
Everts Air Cargo, established as Air Cargo Express, is the sister company of Everts Air Fuel, that specializes in fuel transport throughout the state of Alaska and into Canada.

Destinations
See Everts Air destinations.
Anchorage, Aniak, Bethel, Dillingham, Emmonak, Fairbanks, Galena, Illiamna, King Salmon, Kotzebue, Nome, St. Mary's, Unalakleet, Togiak

Fleet 
As of October 2022, the active Everts Air Cargo fleet includes eighteen aircraft:

 1 Boeing 727-200
 3 Douglas DC-6
 1 Curtiss-Wright C-46 Commando (cargo only)
 3 Douglas DC-9 (cargo only)
 6 McDonnell Douglas MD-80 (cargo only)
 1 McDonnell Douglas MD-88 (cargo only)

A further fourteen aircraft (three DC-9, two MD-80, three BAe 146-300QT, six DC-6 and one C-46) are inactive or in storage.

Operating the Douglas DC-6
Since Northern Air Cargo abandoned their regular service with the Douglas DC-6, Everts Air Cargo is the last airline in the USA to operate scheduled flights with a rather large fleet of 60-year-old piston-powered aircraft. In a 2007 video interview, the Anchorage Station Manager stated that the DC-6 was still considered to be a valuable aircraft for operations in the harsh conditions of Alaska, with excellent landing and takeoff performance on gravel runways. The downside is the difficulty to find avgas and the maintenance labor cost. Everts Air Cargo estimates a ratio of 12 hours of maintenance for every single flying hour. Spare parts could also be a problem but Everts Air Cargo anticipates they will have enough in stock to keep the last DC-6 flying beyond 2020.

References

1-

External links 
 Everts Air Cargo

1993 establishments in Alaska
Airlines based in Alaska
Cargo airlines of the United States
Companies based in Fairbanks, Alaska
Airlines established in 1993